Sambur is the name of two distinct Hasidic dynasties: one founded by Rebbe Moshe Eichenstein of Sambir, Ukraine, a brother of Rabbi Tzvi Hirsh of Zidichov, the other founded by Rabbi Uri Jolles, of the same town.

Hasidic dynasties